Katarzyna Anna Bachleda-Curuś (née Wójcicka, born 1 January 1980) is a Polish speed skater, who was born in Sanok and resides in Zakopane.

Wójcicka is specialised in allround championships as she performs well on all distances, but almost never finishes among the best on a single distance. In Poland she is however one of the best skaters they ever had and she already won fifteen national titles. In 2005, she made a lot of progression and became twelfth at the European Allround Championships and fourteenth at the World Allround Championships. She competed in the 2006 Winter Olympics, finishing tenth at the 3000 metres, eighth at the 1000 metres, eleventh at the 1500 metres and sixteenth at the 5000 metres. A year later she returned to Turin to participate in the 2007 Winter Universiade, winning the gold medal at the 1500 metres. She won the bronze medal in the team pursuit at the 2010 Winter Olympics. She participated at the 2014 Winter Olympics in three events. She was disqualified at the 3000 m, finished 6th at the 1500 m and won silver at the team pursuit.

In 2010, she was awarded the Knight's Cross of the Order of Polonia Restituta by President Lech Kaczyński.

Personal records

References

External links
 Profile at the International Skating Union
 
 

1980 births
Polish female speed skaters
Speed skaters at the 2002 Winter Olympics
Speed skaters at the 2006 Winter Olympics
Speed skaters at the 2010 Winter Olympics
Speed skaters at the 2014 Winter Olympics
Speed skaters at the 2018 Winter Olympics
Olympic speed skaters of Poland
Medalists at the 2010 Winter Olympics
Medalists at the 2014 Winter Olympics
Olympic medalists in speed skating
Olympic silver medalists for Poland
Olympic bronze medalists for Poland
Speed skaters at the 2007 Winter Universiade
Medalists at the 2007 Winter Universiade
Universiade medalists in speed skating
Knights of the Order of Polonia Restituta
Sportspeople from Podkarpackie Voivodeship
People from Sanok
Living people
Universiade gold medalists for Poland
Universiade silver medalists for Poland
Universiade bronze medalists for Poland
21st-century Polish women